The 2003–04 NSW Premier League season was the fourth season of the revamped NSW Premier League.

The Belconnen Blue Devils took out the minor premiership on 47 competition points, after having a superior goal difference over second placed St George Saints. However, the Devils lost two of three games in the finals series, including the grand final 2–0 to Bankstown City Lions. Thus, the Lions were the premiers for the 2003–04 NSW Premier League season.

Throughout the season many Premier League, Super League, Division One and Division Two teams competed in a newly formed FA Cup-style knockout competition called the Continental Tyres Cup in which the Sydney Crescent Star were crowned champions after defeating Bonnyrigg White Eagles in a penalty shootout at Gabbie Stadium.

Clubs
Teams promoted from Super League:
(After the end of the 2003 season.)
Sydney Crescent Star

Teams relegated to Super League:
(After the end of the 2002–03 season.)
  Fairfield Bulls

Regular Series

League table

Results

Finals series

Qualifying Finals

Semi-finals

Preliminary final

Grand final

Gold Medal Dinner
At the end of the season, Football NSW hosted the Gold Medal Dinner, where players, coaches and referees were awarded for their work throughout the Premier League season.

See also
NSW Premier League
Football NSW

References

External links
NSW Premier League Official website

NSW Premier League Season, 2003–04
New South Wales Premier League seasons
Nsw Premier League Season, 2003–04